Jackie Brown (2 March 1935 — 12 January 2020) was a Scottish flyweight boxer who was a British and Commonwealth flyweight champion. He was born in Edinburgh, Scotland.

Amateur career
Brown won the 1958 Amateur Boxing Association British flyweight title, when boxing out of the Leith Victoria ABC.

Professional career
Brown had his first professional fight on 16 October 1958, in Paisley, defeating Mark Quinn in the third round on a technical knockout. He won his first fifteen fights before losing two in succession, to Derek Lloyd and Freddie Gilroy.

In October 1961, he defeated the young Walter McGowan in only his third fight, winning on points over eight rounds in Paisley. In his next fight, in February 1962, he fought for the vacant British flyweight title. The fight was in Birmingham against Brian Cartwright, and Brown won on points over fifteen rounds.

In December 1962, he fought for the vacant Commonwealth flyweight title, against Orizu Obilaso, of Nigeria. Brown was knocked down in the second round but went on to win on points. In May 1963, he defended both his flyweight titles, against Walter McGowan, whom he had previously defeated. The fight was in Paisley, and Brown was knocked out in the twelfth round, losing both his titles. Henceforth, Brown fought as a bantamweight, and held the Scottish area bantamweight title for a while.

His last fight was in October 1966, when he was stopped in the second round against George Bowes, in Newcastle.

See also
 List of British flyweight boxing champions

References

 
 Maurice Golesworthy, Encyclopaedia of Boxing (Eighth Edition) (1988), Robert Hale Limited, 

1935 births
2020 deaths
Deaths from dementia in Australia
Scottish male boxers
Boxers from Edinburgh
Flyweight boxers
Boxers at the 1958 British Empire and Commonwealth Games
Commonwealth Games gold medallists for Scotland
Commonwealth Games medallists in boxing
Medallists at the 1958 British Empire and Commonwealth Games